Dai Llwyd was a 15th-century Welsh harpist, and warrior. He is known to have composed the air, ‘Ffarwel Dai Llwyd’ as he departed to join the army marching to Bosworth Field.

References 

Welsh harpists
15th-century Welsh military personnel
15th-century Welsh musicians